Macrocheilus elegantulus is a species of ground beetle in the subfamily Anthiinae. It was described by Burgeon in 1937.

References

Anthiinae (beetle)
Beetles described in 1937